The Eastern Province of Kenya was one of 8 Provinces of Kenya. Its northern boundary ran along with that of Ethiopia; the North Eastern Province and Coast Province lay to the east and south; and the remainder of Kenya's provinces, including Central Province, ran along its western border. The provincial capital was Embu.

Overview
On 16 July 2009, the province was sub-divided into 3 Sub-Provinces namely lower eastern with Machakos as headquarters, central eastern with Meru as headquarters, and upper eastern with Marsabit as headquarters; however those changes never took effect due to the political wrangles in the Kenyan coalition government at the time. The sub-division of provinces were carried out in all seven Provinces of Kenya, excluding Nairobi. As of March 2013 after the Kenyan general election, 2013, the Eastern Province was subdivided into 8 counties namely:

The province was principally inhabited by the Meru, Kamba and Embu and several pastoralist communities. In 1979 its population was 2.7 million; in 1999, 4,631,779 (according to the 1999 census) and in 2009 the province would have had a population of 5,668,123. In terms of area, it was the second largest province at (140,698.6 km2) in Kenya.

Geography
Eastern Province of Kenya includes the Chalbi Desert, Mount Kenya, and the eastern half of Lake Turkana. The climate in the region is arid to semi-arid. Its most important permanent river is Ewaso Ng'iro.

Villages and settlements

See also
Makueni County
Marsabit County 
Meru County 
Tharaka-Nithi County
Kitui County
Isiolo County
Machakos County

References

 
Provinces of Kenya
Former provinces
2013 disestablishments in Kenya